Philippe Larry Hamilton-Rollings (born 22 February 1993 in Kharkiv, Ukraine) is a professional Ukrainian football defender of Ghanaian descent who plays for Real Pharma Odesa.

Career
Hamilton-Rollings is a product of the FC Arsenal Kharkiv Youth Sportive School System. He spent time as player in the Ukrainian First League and the Ukrainian Second League.

References

External links

1993 births
Living people
Footballers from Kharkiv
Ukrainian footballers
Association football defenders
FC Kharkiv players
FC Helios Kharkiv players
FC Krystal Kherson players
FC Metalist 1925 Kharkiv players
FC Zirka Kropyvnytskyi players
Ukrainian people of Ghanaian descent